Orobanche, commonly known as broomrape, is a genus of over 200 species of small parasitic herbaceous plants, mostly native to the temperate Northern Hemisphere. It is the type genus of the broomrape family Orobanchaceae.

Description
They are best recognized by the yellow- to straw-coloured stems completely lacking chlorophyll, bearing yellow, white, or blue snapdragon-like flowers. The flower shoots are scaly, with a dense terminal spike of 10-20 flowers in most species, although single in one-flowered broomrape (Orobanche uniflora). The leaves are merely triangular scales. The seeds are minute, tan or brown, blackening with age. These plants generally flower from late winter to late spring. When they are not flowering, no part of the plants is visible above the surface of the soil.

Parasitism
As they have no chlorophyll, the broomrapes are totally dependent on other plants for nutrients. Broomrape seeds remain dormant in the soil, often for many years, until stimulated to germinate by certain compounds produced by living plant roots. Broomrape seedlings put out a root-like growth, which attaches to the roots of nearby hosts. Once attached to a host, the broomrape robs its host of water and nutrients.

Some species are only able to parasitise a single plant species, and they are often named after the plant they parasitise, such as ivy broomrape (O. hederae) being restricted to parasitising ivy. Others can infect several genera, such as the lesser broomrape O. minor, which lives on clover and other related Fabaceae.

Branched broomrape Orobanche ramosa, native to central and southwestern Europe but widely naturalised elsewhere, is considered a major threat to crops in some areas. Plants that it targets are tomato, eggplant, potato, cabbage, coleus, bell pepper, sunflower, celery, and beans. In heavily infested areas, branched broomrape can cause total crop failure.

Etymology
The generic name Orobanche comes from the Greek  ( "bitter vetch") +  ( (I) "strangle"). The common name "broomrape" comes from the English "broom" + Latin  ('tuber').

Selected species
Note that this list includes names of more recently described species that may, under further taxonomic scrutiny, prove to be synonyms of a single species. Also, some species formerly included in this genus have been referred to Conopholis.

 List sources :

References

External links

 Control of Branched Broomrape: A Literature Review

 
Orobanchaceae genera
Parasitic plants